Babubhai Patel (born 12 January 1911, date of death unknown) was an Indian cricketer. He played first-class cricket for Hyderabad and Mumbai between 1935 and 1941.

See also
 List of Hyderabad cricketers

References

External links
 

1911 births
Year of death missing
Indian cricketers
Hyderabad cricketers
Mumbai cricketers
People from Vadodara